, (August 15, 1928 – October 1, 2010), was a Japanese dancer and choreographer. Born in Osaka, Japan, she found her way in the international art world through her Japanese classical dance theater forms and experimental performance art forms. For more than 50 years she actively performed, taught and choreographed in classic Japanese dance forms and contemporary collaborative multimedia performance works. She appeared in Japan, the United States and Europe as a choreographer. She collaborated on many of famed director and designer Robert Wilson’s most revered works created during the years 1984 through 1999.

Background and career
Suzushi Hanayagi was born Mitsuko Kiuchi, in Osaka, Japan, in 1928. At the age of three she started her dance training with her aunt, Suzukinu Hanayagi, learning the Hanayagi style, a traditional kabuki school of dance founded in the Edo period. She subsequently began studying with Takehara Han, a master dancer based in Tokyo who developed her singular classic salon style related to mai styles started in Osaka and Kyoto during the Edo period, and incorporating techniques related to Noh theater. Interested in these more abstract and poetic styles, Hanayagi later added studies with Yachiyo Inoue, headmaster of the Inoue school, a Kyoto-based dance style used by geisha, with whom she continued to study until 2000, when she ceased actively performing.

Hanayagi began studying modern dance techniques in Tokyo in the early 1950s, and presented her first modern choreography concert there in 1957, with music by John Cage and contemporary Japanese and European composers.  After seeing exhibitions of works by such artists as Jackson Pollock and Willem de Kooning and hearing that artists like Robert Rauschenberg were dancing, she became interested in experiencing the new arts scene happening in New York City.

At the beginning of the 1960s, Hanayagi arrived in the United States as a cultural exchange visitor under programs sponsored by the Martha Graham School and Japan Society. Also during the 1960s, she participated in the performance experiments happening at Anna Halprin's workshops in the San Francisco Bay Area and in New York City with Fluxus and at the Judson Dance Theater. There, she began to collaborate with Carla Blank. Over 17 years, they created 14 dance theater works, which they performed in New York City through 1966, and then in Japan and the San Francisco Bay Area.

She remained a New York resident for most of the 1960s, where in 1962 she met and married visual artist Isamu Kawai, returning to Osaka in 1967 to be near her family for the birth of their son, Asenda Kiuchi. She re-established Osaka as her main residence again in 1969, to have her family's help raising him after their separation and divorce.

Almost yearly, following her return to Japan, she presented classical dance performances in Osaka and Tokyo, frequently at Tokyo's National Theatre. These were either solo concerts or with her sister Suzusetsu Hanayagi and niece Suzusetsumi Hanayagi, as were her classic dance tours in the United States and Europe. In addition, nearly every year from the early 1980s through 1999, she continued to present solo performances of her original work, mainly at the now closed Jean Jean Theatre in Tokyo. These works also often involved collaborations with other artists, including videographer Katsuhiro Yamaguchi, writers Heiner Muller and Ishmael Reed, composers Netty Simons, David Byrne, Takehisa Kosugi, and Hans Peter Kuhn, and visual artists Hirata and Yasuo Ihara.

From 1984 and continuing throughout the 1990s, Hanayagi served as the choreographer for more than 15 seminal productions and projects by stage director and designer Robert Wilson. Their collaborations were mostly large-scale theater and opera productions presented internationally, beginning with the Knee Plays, premiered at the Walker Art Center in Minneapolis as part of Wilson's multi-sectioned work, The Civil Wars: A Tree Is Best Measured When It Is Down. Among other artistic collaborations that occurred throughout her career, Hanayagi appeared with performance artists Yoko Ono and Ayo, and in works directed by filmmaker Molly Davies, choreographer/filmmaker Elaine Summers and director Julie Taymor, besides serving as coach and choreographer for classic dance performances by the popular Japanese actress Shiho Fujimura.

In 2008, when her artist friends learned Hanayagi was ill with Alzheimer's disease and residing in a special care facility in Osaka, Japan, they gathered together to create a multidisciplinary live performance portrait, KOOL-Dancing In My Mind, a poetic monument fueled by their wish to help guarantee her legacy as a great dancer and choreographer.  Incorporating six live dancers in reconstructions of her choreographic collaborations from works with Blank and Wilson, besides archival photographs, videos of her in performance, excerpts from various published interviews and unpublished letters to Blank, and recent images of her head, hands and feet by Richard Rutkowski, it was first shown at New York City's Guggenheim Museum in their 2009 Works & Process Series and developed further at Guild Hall in East Hampton, was given its international debut at Berlin's Academy of the Arts in September 2010, and was chosen by Wilson to represent his work at his 2010 Jerome Robbins Award ceremony at New York's Baryshnikov Art Center, December 9, 2010. Also in 2010, the Guggenheim performance became the basis of a 26-minute documentary film KOOL, Dancing in my Mind directed by Richard Rutkowski and Wilson, premiered on ARTE TV in France and Sundance Channel in the U.S. Rutkowski's 65 minute film on Ms. Hanayagi, The Space in Back of You, had its New York premiere at the Film Society of Lincoln Center's 2012 Dance on Camera event, its California premiere at the San Francisco Int'l Asian American film festival and international premiere at Thessaloniki Doc Film Festival in March, 2012.

Dance styles and legacies
In a 1986 interview by Japanese Dance magazine editor Roku Hasegawa, Suzushi Hanayagi said:
"[My work] is like a diary. My work is to observe myself and to receive outside stimulation or experiences. I compose my thoughts from these sources.  When I used to live in New York I felt a conflict in using separate ways, because the people that I worked with were in different worlds. After returning to Japan I started to study classic dance form again. This time I tried a different way to work. I like it very much. So I feel very natural when I’m doing it. It resolved the conflict.  I can use two worlds of dance without mixing. I don’t know why I came to admire the conflict. It may be because I become dull or generous. Anyway, I become two worlds with one world. I don’t criticize this in myself."

In a 1986 interview while in residence at American Repertory Theatre in Cambridge, Massachusetts, Hanayagi commented: “When I do classical dance, I don’t want to change the movement. I don't want to put my own expression, my own ego, into the classical dance tradition. When I studied with my teacher one-on-one, I felt something very much like Zen meditation; I felt very pure, I didn’t feel anything about my own ego or expression."

Robert Wilson has said he discovered, from working with Hanayagi, that abstract movement can generate meaning and that movement can be a counterpoint to language. Hanayagi helped him open up the vocabulary of the gesture and opened Wilson's eyes to the importance of feet and the connection of the body to the ground, impacting the ways Wilson's actors stand and move through space, using their entire bodies to convey meaning. Without her influence, he would not have been able to master the literary texts and operatic pieces that have become such a focus of the latter part of his career.

In an interview published in Japan in the book Odori Wa Jinsei (Dance Is A Life, 2003), Hanayagi was asked why she could work with mixed traditions again and again when working with Robert Wilson. And she answered: "All that I learned from the teachers has become my flesh and blood. And when I am asked to choreograph, it all comes out. When I worked on the choreography for Bob Wilson's Le Martyre de Saint Sebastien, I felt so much responsibility I couldn't sleep the night before -- I was thinking so hard about what I was doing. It's not modern dance, it’s not ballet. It isn't anything. It's my original work. Yet it's not mine. It is what was given to me by my teachers."

List of works

Solo works, partial listing
1962: (performed at Hunter Playhouse, January 11, 1962)
 Song of the Soil, with music by Michio Mamiya
 Spirit of the Wood, with music by Pierre Henry and Pierre Schaeffer
 Without Color, with music by Toshiro Mayuzumi
 Ekagra, with music by Kazuo Fukushima
 Flying God, with music by Philippe Arthuyet
 Womb, with music by Karlheinz Stockhausen
 Action, with music by Mauricio Kagel
1963: (premieres performed at Fashion Institute of Technology, April 9, 1962)
 Tracer, with music Circle of Attitudes by Netty Simons
 Wood Grain, with music from Karuna by Kazuo Fukushima
 9 Heads 1000 Eyes 990 Hands 6 Legs, with music by Teiji Ito
1964 (premieres performed in Tokyo, Japan)
 Echo White, with music by Morton Feldman
Double Joint, with music by Karlheinz Stockhausen
Steps Stop, with music by Earle Brown
1976: Clown
1978: Unkind Trotsky, with Down Town Boogie Woogie Band
1979:
Nonsense
Kore I
1980: Kore II
1981: Kore III
1982: Americium 231, with music composed by Netty Simons and Carlos Santana
1984: Americium 95
1985: Americium 3958, with David Byrne music
1986: Americium 225
1987: Americium '97 with Libgart Schwarz, 1001 Nacht 
1989: Americium 225 '89, with composer/artist Hans Peter Kuhn
1990: Americium 1931, with composer/artist Hans Peter Kuhn
1996: Americium Die, with composer/artist Hans Peter Kuhn
1997: Americium/ E.M., with Conjure I, music to texts by Ishmael Reed
1998: Americium '98: Black Road to the Vanishing Point, with Conjure II, music to texts by Ishmael Reed1999: Americium '99: Blue of Dance, Picasso blue & Yves Klein blue, based on concept by Ishmael Reed

Collaborations with Carla Blank
1964: Rainbow #4, Fluxus event with Ay-O
1965: Spaced1966:Wall St. JournalSidelights1971-73: Work1972: With Son1973:Ghost DanceShadow Dance1974:Crowd, with film by Sekio ImuraThe Lost State of Franklin, collaboration with Ishmael Reed
1976: Animuls1977: Trickster Today1979–1981: Kore at EleusisCollaborations with Robert Wilson
1984: The Knee Plays, from the CIVIL warS, a collaboration also with composer David Byrne
1986:
  Alceste, based on Euripides’ play, with prologue text by Heiner Muller and epilogue music by Laurie Anderson
  Hamletmachine, a collaboration based on Heiner Muller’s text
1987:
  Death, Destruction and Detroit II  The Forest, also with composer David Byrne
1988:
  Le Martyre de Saint Sebastien  Pelleas et Melisande 1989:
  La Femme a la Cafetiere, a film with Ms. Hanayagi as featured performer
  De Materie  Orlando 1990:
  King Lear  Alceste, Puccini’s opera
1992: Dr. Faustus Lights the Lights, from Gertrude Stein’s text
1993: Madame Butterfly, an opera by Puccini
1999: Death, Destruction and Detroit III: the days before2009: Kool, Dancing in my Mind, also with Carla Blank and Richard Rutkowski

Other multimedia collaborations with Suzushi Hanayagi as choreographer, partial listing
1983: Movements, the first collaboration with videographer Katsuhiro Yamaguchi
1988: Arrivals & Departures, a collaboration conceived and directed by Molly Davies, with music composed and performed by Takehisa Kosugi
1987: Bitwin, Dance in Media, collaboration with Katsuhiro Yamaguchi, including their video "Ms. Hands and Feet"
1988: Oedipus Rex, directed by Julie Taymor with the Japan Philharmonic directed by Seiji Ozawa
1994: Sansho the Bailiff. Directed by Andrzej Wajda with sets and costumes by Eiko Ishioka, lighting by Jennifer Tipton, sound by Hans Peter Kuhn, and choreography by Suzushi Hanayagi. Workshops for a live stage performance version based on the film, in fall 1993 at the Brooklyn Academy of Music. A smaller scale workshop was mounted in Los Angeles in spring 1994. Plans to produce the play on Broadway were postponed indefinitely.

Films, partial listing
 1975: The Art of Make-Up for the Japanese classical dance; [and] Classical Dance (VHS, 2 hours). Directed by Don MacLennan. Documentary produced by Beate Gordon and Don MacLennan.  Suzushi Hanayagi and her sister, Suzusetsu Hanayagi on Juita-mai technique, repertoire, make-up and dressing, with commentary by Beate Gordon.  Available in the Performing Arts Research Collection-Dance of New York Public Library at Lincoln Center.
1986: It's Clean, It Just Looks Dirty. Film by John Giorno that includes excerpts that document Suzushi Hanayagi choreographing and performing, in 1984, in rehearsals and performance of the Knee Plays, a collaboration with Robert Wilson and David Byrne,  at the Walker Art Center, Minneapolis, MN.
1989: La Femme à la Cafétière. 6 minutes. Directed by Robert Wilson with Ms. Hanayagi as featured performer. Inspired by a Paul Cezanne painting of the same name, currently in the collection of the Muśee d’Orsay. 
2009: KOOL, Dancing in My Mind. 30 minutes. Short Documentary. Directed by Richard Rutkowski and Robert Wilson. Produced by Jorn Weisbrodt, Richard Rutkowski and Hisami Kuroiwa. Co-produced by: ARTE and INA. Editing by Keiko Deguchi and Brendan Russell.
2011: The Space In Back of You. 68 minutes. Documentary. Directed and with principal cinematography by Richard Rutkowski. Produced by Hisami Kuroiwa and Richard Rutkowski. Principal film editor, Keiku Deguchi. Dramaturge: Carla Blank. Includes interviews with David Byrne, musician; Molly Davies, filmmaker; Anna Halprin, choreographer; Simone Forti, choreographer; Hans Peter Kuhn, composer; Yoshio Yabara, designer; Yachiyo Inoue V, the granddaughter of Ms. Hanayagi’s master teacher, Yachiyo Inoue IV, and Carla Blank, choreographer, dramaturge.

CD/DVD
2007: Byrne, David. The Knee Plays.  Nonesuch303228-2. Contains Music for the Knee Plays by Robert Wilson and David Byrne from Robert Wilson's the CIVIL warS: and a slide show of sequential photographs of the entire 57-minute original performance by JoAnn Verburg, taken at the Walker Art Center premiere in Minneapolis in 1984.

References

Further reading
 Anderson, Jack. "Life Through A Glass, Darkly", a review of Arrivals and Departures, a collaboration with filmmaker and director Molly Davies. The New York Times, May 10, 1988.
 Bernheimer, Martin. "Robert Wilson Stages an Abstract Vision of 'Alceste' in Chicago". The Los Angeles Times, September 17, 1990.
 Blank, Carla. "Suzushi Hanayagi (1928–2010)". dancemagazine. Originally online at http://www.dancemagazine.com/in_memoriam/4579}, a web address currently no longer available, it was the only known obituary to be published after the artist's death was announced in 2012.
 Blank, Carla. "Suzushi Hanayagi at Mulhouse".  Sami Ludwig, editor: American Multiculturalism in Context, Views from at Home and Abroad. Newcastle upon Tyne, UK: Cambridge Scholars Publishing, 2017, (239–260).
 Byrne, David.  The Knee Plays, Includes bonus DVD with 57-minute time lapse slideshow of photos by JoAnn Verburg with music, from the original 1984 Walker Art Center production in Minneapolis. Nonesuch, reissued, 2007.
 Dunning, Jennifer, interviewer. "2 Worlds of Dance of Suzushi Hanayagi". The New York Times, November 29, 1978.
 Hasegawa, Roku, interviewer, "It is like a diary". Tokyo: Dance #36, 1986; Berkeley: Konch, Vol. 1, #1, 1990, in translation by S. Hanayagi with C. Blank.
 Jowitt, Deborah. "Robert Wilson Pays Homage to Suzushi Hanayagi at the Guggenheim". The Village Voice, April 22, 2009. 
 Kageyama, Yuri. "'Last' Homage to Suzushi Hanayagi".  The Japan Times: Friday, July 24, 2009. 
Levine, Marianna. "”Robert Wilson’s Dance for a Friend" The Sag Harbor Express, posted 7 August 2009. https://web.archive.org/web/20090810011347/http://sagharboronline.com/sagharborexpress/arts/robert-wilsons-dance-for-a-friend-3990
 La Rocco, Claudia. "Choreographers Reveal A 'Last Collaboration'" The New York Times, April 21, 2009.
 Levine, Marianna. "Robert Wilson's Dance for a Friend", The Sag Harbor Express, posted 7 August 2009. 
 Mee, Erin, interviewer, "Laurie Anderson and Suzushi Hanayagi: Modernists with Classical Roots".  The A.R.T. News, Vol. VI, Number 3, March 1986 
 Okamoto, Taiyo and Joseph Reid. "To Embrace the Space in Back of You".  COOL, a Bilingual Art Magazine. January 29, 2012.  This interview with Richard Rutkowski originally appeared on the web site for "The Space in Back of You", which is no longer available online.
 Reed, Ishmael. "Tilting Toward A Masterpiece, Take 23". Posted May 8, 2009. 
 Small, Timothy. "A Kool Tribute to a Dance Partner", The East Hampton Star. July 30, 2009. 
 Stein, Bonnie Sue, interviewer, Dance Magazine, May 1988, pages 38–39. https://web.archive.org/web/20101226183310/http://www.gohproductions.org/gohdirector.htm
 Tsurumi, Kazuko, with Senrei Nishikawa, and Suzushi Hanayagi. Odori Wa Jinsei (Dance Is A Life). Fujiwara-Shoten Publications, 2003.
 Weiler, Christel. “Japanese Traces in Robert Wilson’s Productions", in The Intercultural Performance Reader, edited by Patrice Pavis. Routledge, 1996.
 Weinreich, Regina. "Turning Japanese: Tennessee Williams and Robert Wilson". Posted: August 11, 2009.  
 Yang, Chi-Hui. The Space in Back of You: A Conversation with Director Richard Rutkowski. Posted August 25, 2013, in Cinema Asian America Xfinity on Demand. 
 Yung, Susan. "Robert Wilson: Mastering Time". Posted 04/21/09. 
 Zieda, Margarita. "Dancing in My Mind". Studija'', Visual Art magazine. June 2010.

1928 births
2010 deaths
Japanese choreographers